Jacob August Lienau (March 1854 – May 6, 1906) was an American architect.

Biography
He was born in March 1854 in New Jersey to Detlef Lienau. On November 30, 1884, he married Elizabeth Blair Williams (1854–1932) at Calvary Protestant Episcopal Church in Manhattan. She was the daughter of John Stanton Williams and Mary Maclay Pentz, and the sister of Stephen Guion Williams. They had three children: Elizabeth B. Lienau (1885–?), Mary W. Lienau (1887–?), and August William Lienau (1897–?).

He died on May 6, 1906 and was buried in Woodlawn Cemetery.

Designs
"Tulipwood"
"Shady Rest", which was built for Mary Maclay Pentz Williams at 1135 Hamilton Street. It became a nursing home, Somerset Manor South, and was demolished in 2008.
"Merrynook" was his own home at 1201 Hamilton Street and it later housed the Art Institute of New Jersey.
220 Mercer St, Princeton, New Jersey for Ernest Cushing Richardson
160 Hodge Road, Princeton, New Jersey for Marie Coddington

References

1854 births
1906 deaths
Architects from New Jersey
19th-century American architects